Malojloj is a census-designated place located within the larger village of Inarajan, in the United States territory of Guam. It is specifically located within the hills north of the central Inarajan.

See also 
 List of census-designated places in Guam

Census-designated places in Guam